Schuyler County is a county located in the northeastern portion of the U.S. state of Missouri. As of the 2020 census, its population was 4,032,  making it the fourth-least populous county in Missouri. Its county seat is Lancaster. The county was organized February 14, 1845, from Adair County, and named for General Philip Schuyler, delegate to the Continental Congress and U.S. Senator from New York.

Schuyler County is part of the Kirksville, MO Micropolitan Statistical Area.

, a World War II-era cargo ship, was named in part for Schuyler County, Missouri.

Geography
It is the second-smallest county in Missouri by area. Schuyler County borders Iowa to the north.

Adjacent counties
Appanoose County, Iowa (northwest)
Davis County, Iowa (northeast)
Scotland County (east)
Adair County (south)
Putnam County (west)

Major highways
 U.S. Route 63
 U.S. Route 136
 Route 202

Demographics

As of the census of 2010, there were 4,431 people, 1,725 households, and 1,193 families residing in the county.  The population density was 14 people per square mile (5/km2).  There were 2,027 housing units at an average density of 7 per square mile (3/km2).  The racial makeup of the county was 98.44% White, 0.05% Black or African American, 0.31% Native American, 0.17% Asian, 0.02% Pacific Islander, 0.17% from other races, and 0.84% from two or more races. Approximately 0.65% of the population were Hispanic or Latino of any race.

There were 1,725 households, out of which 29.60% had children under the age of 18 living with them, 59.10% were married couples living together, 7.20% had a female householder with no husband present, and 30.80% were non-families. 28.20% of all households were made up of individuals, and 15.20% had someone living alone who was 65 years of age or older.  The average household size was 2.39 and the average family size was 2.90.

In the county, the population was spread out, with 24.60% under the age of 18, 6.70% from 18 to 24, 24.80% from 25 to 44, 24.10% from 45 to 64, and 19.80% who were 65 years of age or older.  The median age was 41 years. For every 100 females, there were 93.10 males.  For every 100 females age 18 and over, there were 90.80 males.

The median income for a household in the county was $27,385, and the median income for a family was $34,564. Males had a median income of $25,625 versus $18,728 for females. The per capita income for the county was $15,850.  About 13.20% of families and 17.00% of the population were below the poverty line, including 22.10% of those under age 18 and 17.60% of those age 65 or over.

The population was estimated, according to the U.S. Census Bureau, to be 4,508 on July 1 of 2017.

2020 Census

Education

Public schools

 Schuyler County R-1 School District – Queen City
 Schuyler County Elementary School (K-06)
 Schuyler County Middle School (07-08)
 Schuyler County High School (09-12)

Public libraries
 Schuyler County Library

Politics

Local
The Democratic Party predominantly controls politics at the local level in Schuyler County. Democrats hold all but four of the elected positions in the county.

State

All of Schuyler County is included in Missouri's 4th District in the Missouri House of Representatives and is represented by  Craig Redmon (R-Canton).

 

All of Schuyler County is a part of Missouri's 18th District in the Missouri Senate and is currently represented by Brian Munzlinger (R-Williamstown).

Federal

All of Schuyler County is included in Missouri's 6th Congressional District and is currently represented by Sam Graves (R-Tarkio) in the U.S. House of Representatives.

Communities

Cities
 Downing
 Greentop (small part in Adair County)
 Lancaster (county seat)
 Queen City

Village
 Glenwood

Unincorporated community
 Clifton
 Coatsville
 Julesburg

Notable people

 Farrell Dobbs, American Trotskyist, trade unionist, and presidential candidate for the Socialist Workers Party.
 William Preston Hall (aka "The Colonel," "Diamond Billy," "Horse King of the World") (February 29, 1864 – June 29, 1932) Exotic animal dealer, horse and mule breeder, circus impresario.
 Howard R. Hughes Sr., co-founder of the Hughes Tool Company and father of Howard Robard Hughes Jr., the multimillionaire.
 Rupert Hughes, novelist and screenwriter, brother of Howard Hughes Sr. and uncle of Howard Hughes Jr.
 Darrin Vincent, bluegrass producer and Grammy-nominated performer (Kentucky Thunder, Dailey & Vincent)
 Rhonda Vincent, Award-winning Bluegrass performer.

See also
 National Register of Historic Places listings in Schuyler County, Missouri

References

External links
 Digitized 1930 Plat Book of Schuyler County  from University of Missouri Division of Special Collections, Archives, and Rare Books

 
Kirksville micropolitan area, Missouri
1845 establishments in Missouri
Populated places established in 1845